Gary Collins-Simpson (born November 1961) is a Canadian retired Paralympic swimmer. He competed at the 1980 Paralympics, winning three medals.

Collins-Simpson was born in Calgary, Alberta and raised in British Columbia and had his left leg amputated below the knee at the age of five after he was hit by a semi trailer while riding his bicycle. He later attended the University of British Columbia.

References

1961 births
Living people
Medalists at the 1980 Summer Paralympics
Paralympic gold medalists for Canada
Paralympic silver medalists for Canada
Paralympic medalists in swimming
Swimmers at the 1980 Summer Paralympics
Paralympic swimmers of Canada
Swimmers from Calgary
Canadian male backstroke swimmers
Canadian male butterfly swimmers
Canadian male medley swimmers